Summit Public Radio and TV, Inc. is a nonprofit 501(C)(3) FM and TV translator association dedicated to rebroadcasting National Public Radio and over-the-air network television stations originating from Denver and Eagle County, Colorado to mountainous Summit County, Colorado

External links
The Summit Public Radio and TV, Inc. website.

Non-profit organizations based in Colorado